David Shofet is an Iranian-American rabbi. He is the founder and chief rabbi of the Nessah Synagogue in Beverly Hills, California.

Early life
Shofet was born in Tehran, Iran. David comes from a family who have been rabbis for twelve generations. He is a Sephardi Jew. His father, Yedidia Shofet, served as the Chief Rabbi of Iran from 1922 to 1980. His mother is Rabbanit Heshmat Shofet.

Shortly after the Iranian Revolution of 1979, Shofet emigrated to the United States.

Career

Shofet founded the Nessah Synagogue in 1980. They first met at the Beth Jacob Congregation. Since 2002, the synagogue has been based on South Rexford Drive in Beverly Hills, California. Shofet still serves as its chief rabbi.

Shortly after his father's death, Persian-Jewish leaders signed a resolution to recognize him as the primary religious leader of their community.

Shofet is opposed to same-sex marriage. He has brought to light the homosexual acts that are prohibited in the Torah.

References

Living people
People from Tehran
People from Beverly Hills, California
Iranian emigrants to the United States
Exiles of the Iranian Revolution in the United States
Iranian Jews
American Sephardic Jews
American Orthodox rabbis
American people of Iranian-Jewish descent
Year of birth missing (living people)